Farhad Fakhimzadeh (born 14 October 1984) is an Iranian professional futsal player. He is currently a member of Giti Pasand in the Iranian Futsal Super League. He is the first captain in the Iranian Futsal Super League to win four consecutive championships.The last championship of him and his team in the 2020-21 seaseon of Iranian Futsal League.

Honours

Country 
 AFC Futsal Championship
 Champion (1): 2004
 Runners-up (1): 2014

Club 
 Iranian Futsal Super League
 Champions (4): 2013–14 (Dabiri) - 2017–18 (Mes Sungun), 2018–19 (Mes Sungun), 2019–20 (Mes Sungun)
 Runners-up (1): 2016–17 (Dabiri)
 Indonesia Pro Futsal League
Champions: 2018 (Vamos Mataram)
 AFC Futsal Club Championship
 Champion (1): 2018 (Mes Sungun)
 Runners-up (1): 2019 (Mes Sungun)
 Third place (1): 2014 (Dabiri)

Individual 
 Top Goalscorer:
 Iranian Futsal Super League: 2013–14 (Dabiri) (26)

References

External links 

 Farhad Fakhimzadeh on Instagram

1984 births
Living people
People from Tabriz
Sportspeople from Tabriz
Iranian men's futsal players
Futsal forwards
Gostaresh Foolad FSC players
Foolad Mahan FSC players
Firooz Sofeh FSC players
Dabiri FSC players
Mes Sungun FSC players
Giti Pasand FSC players
Iranian expatriate futsal players
Iranian expatriate sportspeople in Indonesia